The 2022 UCI Gravel World Championships were held on 8 and 9 October 2022 in Veneto, Italy. It was the first time the gravel world championships were held.

Schedule
All times listed below are for the local time – Central European Summer Time or UTC+02:00.

Medal summary

References

UCI Gravel World Championships
UCI
UCI
Gravel